Phillips High School may refer to:

Phillips High School (Alabama) in Bear Creek
Wendell Phillips Academy High School
Mary E. Phillips High School
Phillips High School (Wisconsin)